The 1967 Indian vice presidential election was held on 6 May 1967 to elect Vice-President of India. V. V. Giri was elected for the post.

Results

|- align=center
!style="background-color:#E9E9E9" align=center|Candidate
!style="background-color:#E9E9E9" |Electoral Votes
!style="background-color:#E9E9E9" |% of Votes
|-
|align="left"|V. V. Giri||483||71.45
|-
|align="left"|Mohammad Habib||193||28.55
|-
| colspan="3" style="background:#e9e9e9;"|
|-
! style="text-align:left;"| Total
! style="text-align:right;"|676
! style="text-align:right;"|100.00
|-
| colspan="4" style="background:#e9e9e9;"| 
|-
|-
|style="text-align:left;"|Valid Votes||676||99.56
|-
|style="text-align:left;"|Invalid Votes||3||0.44
|-
|style="text-align:left;"|Turnout||679||90.65
|-
|style="text-align:left;"|Abstentions||70||9.35
|-
|style="text-align:left;"|Electors||749|| style="background:#e9e9e9;"|
|-
|}

See also
 1967 Indian presidential election

References

External links

Vice-presidential elections in India
Vice president